Alleles have identity by type (IBT) when they have the same phenotypic effect or, if applied to a variation in the composition of DNA such as a single nucleotide polymorphism, when they have the same DNA sequence.

Alleles that are identical by type fall into two groups; those that are identical by descent (IBD) because they arose from the same allele in an earlier generation; and those that are non-identical by descent (NIBD) because they arose from separate mutations. NIBD can also be identical by state (IBS) though, if they share the same mutational expression but not through a recent common ancestor.  Parent-offspring pairs share 50% of their genes IBD, and monozygotic twins share 100% IBD.

See also 
 Population genetics

External links 
 https://web.archive.org/web/20060309055031/http://darwin.eeb.uconn.edu/eeb348/lecture-notes/identity.pdf
 http://zwets.com/pedkin/thompson.pdf

Classical genetics